Hermann Wilhelm Weil (1876 – July 6, 1949), was a baritone singer at the Metropolitan Opera.

Biography
He was born in 1876. He sang with the Metropolitan Opera starting in 1911.

He drowned on July 6, 1949, in Blue Mountain Lake, New York after falling from an outboard motorboat.

References

External links

American operatic baritones
1876 births
1949 deaths